Nordic — Office of Architecture is a Norwegian architecture and masterplanning practice specialising in complex projects such as airports and hospitals. The practice was founded as Narud Stokke Wiig Architects and Planners in 1979 but changed names in 2012. Partners in Nordic — Office of Architecture include Gudmund Stokke, John Arne Bjerknes, Johannes Eggen, Christian Henriksen, Geoffrey Clark, Eskild Andersen, Hallgrimur Thor Sigurdsson, Birkir Árnason, Bjørn Olav Susæg, Camilla Heier Anglero, Erik Urheim, Hallur Kristmundsson, Hanne Hemsen, Helgi Mar Hallgrímsson, Ingrid Motzfeldt, Knut Hovland, Sigurður Hallgrímsson and Sofie Peschardt. The practice employs 220 people located in the main office in Oslo, Copenhagen, Reykjavik and in London.

Since 1991 Nordic — Office of Architecture has been involved in the design and planning of Oslo Airport, following the decision that the main airport would move to Gardermoen from its previous location at Fornebu. The airport opened in 1998, and Nordic has been involved in the continuous improvement works and the current vast expansion including a new pier, as part of Team_T. Team_T is a collaboration between Nordic — Office of Architecture, COWI, Norconsult, Aas-Jakobsen and Per Rasmussen AS.

In 2014, Nordic — Office of Architecture, Grimshaw Architects and Haptic Architects were assigned by the consortium of Cengiz-Kolin-Limak-Mapa-Kalyon to design what will become the world's largest airport, Istanbul Airport. This airport will be able to handle 150 million passengers per year.

Nordic — Office of Architecture is a part of the New Norwegian Government Quarter as the lead architect of Team URBIS, the project team consisting of Nordic — Office of Architecture, Haptic Architects, Cowi, Aas-Jacobsen, Ingeniør Per Rasmussen, SLA landscape architects, Bjørbekk & Lindheim landscape architects, Asplan Viak, Scenario, NIKU and Norsam.

Notable hospital projects include St. Olav's University Hospital which was completed in 2013. This vast project included six new clinical centres in central Trondheim, which were all built while the hospital was fully operational. The hospital has been well integrated in the city and has received awards for urban design, sustainable design and inclusive design. Awards include The 'Health Project Over 40000 Award' from the International Academy for Design & Health in 2014 and 'The Innovation Award for Inclusive Design' from The Norwegian Centre for Design and Architecture 2015.

Notable works
Oslo Airport
St. Olav's University Hospital
Istanbul Airport

References

'Storoppdrag med nytt sykehus', Dagens Næringsliv, 26.01.2015
'Tyrkisk flyplass til 58 milliarder', Dagens Næringsliv, 23.04.2014
'Grand designs for Istanbul Airport', World Architecture News, 16.04.2014
'Her er årets stiligste bygninger', Aftenposten, 05.07.2013
'OSL: 15 years and beyond', Iestyn Adams, 2013
'Vurderte ekteskap, skilte lag', Dagens Næringsliv, 30.11.2012
'Arkitekturleksikon', Arne Gunnarsjå, 2007

Architecture firms of Norway
Design companies established in 1979
1979 establishments in Norway